Creatures of the Night (Italian: Creature della notte) is a 1934 Italian drama film directed by Amleto Palermi and starring Tatyana Pavlova, Isa Pola and María Denis.

Cast
 Tatyana Pavlova as L'ex-carcerate 
 Isa Pola as Sua figlia  
 María Denis as L'altra ragazza  
 Dino Di Luca as Il mascalzone  
 Isa Miranda as Una gigolette  
 Piero Carnabuci as Il ricco gentiluomo  
 Vasco Creti as Il cliente del Tabarin  
 Osvaldo Valenti 
 Fosco Giachetti 
 Olinto Cristina
 Rocco D'Assunta 
 Ernesto Torrini 
 Carlo Chertier

References

Bibliography 
 Aprà, Adriano. The Fabulous Thirties: Italian cinema 1929-1944. Electa International, 1979.

External links 
 

1934 drama films
Italian drama films
1934 films
1930s Italian-language films
Films directed by Amleto Palermi
Italian black-and-white films
1930s Italian films